Victoria Anthony is a decorated American freestyle wrestler. She is a two-time Junior World Champion, a two-time U.S. Open Champion, and a three-time Pan American Champion. Anthony has represented the United States in two World Championships, coming 5th at both the 2013 and 2017 Worlds. Additionally, Anthony was the first woman ever to win four consecutive college national titles, becoming the first-ever 4x WCWA National Champion. Anthony is ranked USA's #2 ranked at 50 kg.

She has made 8 consecutive United States National Teams.

She is a 2009 graduate of Marina (Calif.) High School. In 2012, she won her first college National Championship for Simon Fraser University. In 2013, Simon Fraser won the NWCA National Duals Women’s title, led by Anthony and other top American and Canadian female wrestlers. In 2014, 2017, and 2020 Anthony won Pan American Championships gold. In January 2015 she won gold at the 2015 Dave Schultz Memorial. In 2016, she failed to qualify for the Olympics, placing second in the American best-of-three series Trials after losing to Haley Augello. Anthony lost the first match, won the second match, and lost the third match.

She competed at the 2020 Ivan Yarygin international, in the qualification round she lost to Russia's Nadezhda Sokolova, but went on to wrestle back and win a bronze medal. In 2021, she won the gold medal in the 50 kg event at the Matteo Pellicone Ranking Series 2021 held in Rome, Italy.

References

External links
 

American female sport wrestlers
Living people
1991 births
Pan American Wrestling Championships medalists
21st-century American women